Ejin may refer to:

Ejin Banner, subdivision of Inner Mongolia, China
Ejin River, in Northern China